Dingane ka Senzangakhona Zulu (c. 1795–29 January 1840), commonly referred to as Dingane or Dingaan, was a Zulu chief who became king of the Zulu Kingdom in 1828

Dingaan is also a given name and may refer to:

Dingaan Myolwa, South African politician
Dingaan Thobela (born 1966), South African boxer

See also 

 Day of the Vow, originally called Dingane's Day or Dingaansdag
 Dingaanstat, mission station of the Dutch Reformed Church, formerly a village in South Africa
 Dingana dingana, a species of butterfly